Woven Cord is a live progressive rock album by Iona with the All Souls Orchestra, released in 1999. It was recorded on 29 May 1999 at the Royal Festival Hall in London, when Iona joined with the All Souls Orchestra for a unique collaboration to celebrate the band's tenth anniversary. Additional recording was made at Visions of Albion, Yorkshire, in July and August 1999.  The engineers were Nigel Palmer and Matt Parkin.

Personnel

Band
 Joanne Hogg - vocals, acoustic guitar, keyboards
 Dave Bainbridge - guitars, keyboards, bouzouki
 Phil Barker - bass guitar
 Frank Van Essen - drums, percussion, violin
 Troy Donockley - Uillean pipes, whistles, cittern, guitars, keyboards, vocals

Additional musicians and special guests
Nick Beggs - Chapman stick (on "Man" and "Revelation")
Tim Harries - double bass
Marlou Van Essen - backing vocals (on "Lindisfarne", "Dancing On The Wall", "Revelation")
All Souls Orchestra - orchestral instruments
Noel Tredinnick - conductor, arranger

Track listing
Disc 1 - total time 78:08
"Overture"  – 5:01
"Bi"-Se I Mo Shuil Pt. 1  – 2:33
"Matthew" - The Man  – 13:01
"White Sands"  – 4:15
"Murlough Bay"  – 4:17
"Dancing on the Wall"  – 5:27
"Encircling"  – 12:24
"Lindisfarne"  – 7:52
"Revelation"  – 7:00
"Woven Cord"  – 9:25
"Beyond These Shores"  – 6:53

Release details
1999, UK, Alliance Records ALD 1901802, release date ? October 1999, CD 
1999, USA, Forefront Records FFD-5246, release date ? October 1999, CD 
2005, UK, Open Sky Records OPENVP6CD, release date 20 June 2005, CD

Iona (band) albums
1999 albums